Laibin North railway station is a railway station in Xingbin District, Laibin, Guangxi, China. It is an intermediate stop on the Liuzhou–Nanning intercity railway. It opened on 20 July 2014.

The station has two island platforms and a side platform, with a total of five platform faces.

References 

Railway stations in Guangxi
Railway stations in China opened in 2014